I riddarnas spår (in Swedish: In Footprints of the Knights) is a non-fictional book by Norwegian-Swedish fantasy author Margit Sandemo, which deals with De svarta riddarna that was at the time newest of the series of novels by her. By autumn 1999 she had written 107 books during the last seventeen years and decided to have a holiday from writing for the next seven weeks. She hired a house in Costa Blanca, Spain, but two days after beginning the holiday she began writing the next series of novels. The husband of writer, Asbjørn Sandemo had died earlier in the same year, and she experienced writing De svarta riddarna as a kind of therapy.

She began the writing of I riddarnas spår since had finished the fifth volume Skuggor (in Swedish: The Shadows) in series. Reader can peek at beyond the fictional scenes of novel and adventure with author on the sites of novel rushing photos, travel description and historical facts. I riddarnas spår is a story about the birth of De svarta riddarna as well as first and foremost about the author herself.

Travel books
Books by Margit Sandemo
Swedish biographies